Appleton-le-Street is a small village and in the Ryedale district of North Yorkshire, England.

History

The village is mentioned in the Domesday Book as "Appletun", part of the Maneshou Hundred. At the time of the Norman Conquest it belonged to Cnut, son of Karli, but subsequently handed over to William I.

The Thirsk and Malton railway line used to pass through the village.

Governance

The village lies within the Thirsk and Malton parliamentary constituency. It also lies within the Amotherby ward of Ryedale District Council and the Malton electoral district of North Yorkshire County Council.

Geography

It is on the B1257 Malton to Stokesley road between Amotherby and Barton-le-Street.

The soil is a mixture of Oxford clay on corallian beds. Limestone and Sandstone were quarried in the village.

Demography

According to the 2001 UK Census, the population for the civil parish was 117 in 53 households. Of those households, 29 were detached dwellings and 34 were owner occupied. Of the total population, 93 were over the age of 16, of which 55 were economically active.

The 2011 census recorded the population as 122.

Religion

The church in the village dates from Saxon times and is a Grade I listed building dedicated as All Saints.  All Saints Episcopal Church in Appleton, Wisconsin, is an evocation of and homage to All Saints Anglican Church in Appleton-le-Street built in 1905 by Shepley, Rutan and Coolidge.

Notable people
Thomas Taylor (1825–1859), cricketer

References

External links 
 
 
 Appleton-le-Street parish

Villages in North Yorkshire